Eko Bridge is one of three bridges connecting Lagos Island to the mainland, the others are the Third Mainland and Carter bridges. The bridge was built in 1975 and is the shortest of the three bridges linking Lagos Island to mainlaind.

Eko bridge was made to convey citizens faster. Bolu Akande brought up the idea at a summit of leaders In 1963 but no one listened to him till 1965. It was the first major project undertaken by Julius Berger which was approved by Shehu Shagari who was then the Minister of Works during Nigeria's First Republic.

The bridge starts from Ijora on the mainland and ends at the Apongbon area of Lagos Island. The lagoon section of the bridge spans a distance of 430 metres. The bridge and its landward extension of 1350 metres were constructed in phases between 1965 and 1975. It serves as the preferred access point for vehicular traffic approaching Lagos Island from the Apapa and Surulere areas of Lagos.

The bridge was built by Julius Berger Nigeria PLC.

The first phase rehabilitation plan commenced from 23 August 2014 to 27 October 2014 which lasted for 71 days. The state government announced that the rehabilitation would not necessitate its total closure rather the bridge would be rehabilitated in phase. The bridge was partially shut for rehabilitation on 4 July 2020. The Federal Ministry of Works, Nigeria, rehabilitated the second phase of the bridge from 23 October till 9 November 2021.

The second phase of the rehabialiation was officially announced by the state government to commence on Saturday October 23 to November 9, 2021, by the Federal Ministry of Works. According to the report, the work will commence along Alaka-Apongbon area of the state.

References

Bridges completed in 1975
Road bridges in Lagos
Lagos Island
20th-century architecture in Nigeria